Wise County Public Schools is a school district based in Wise, Virginia in Wise County. It operates 5 elementary/primary schools, 1 combined school, 3 middle schools, 3 high schools, an alternative school and a vocational-technical school.

Schools

External links
Wise County Public Schools website

School divisions in Virginia
Education in Wise County, Virginia